Mysore Tanga (Kannada: ಮೈಸೂರು ಟಾಂಗ) is a 1968 Indian Kannada film, directed by G. V. Iyer and produced by B Vijayalakshmi. The film stars Kalyan Kumar, B. Vijayalakshmi, Udaykumar and Balakrishna in lead roles. The film had musical score by Vijaya Bhaskar.

Cast

Kalyan Kumar
B. Vijayalakshmi
Udaykumar
Balakrishna
Narasimharaju
Dinesh
Ganapathi Bhat
Bangalore Nagesh
Shyam
Venkataram
Kupparaj
Kuppuraj
Anantharam Maccheri
Madan
Shailashree
Jr Revathi
B. Jaya
Sacchu
School Master Lakshmi
Hema
Sarasa

References

1968 films
1960s Kannada-language films
Films scored by Vijaya Bhaskar
Films directed by G. V. Iyer